Emplectonematidae is a family of worms belonging to the order Hoplonemertea.

Genera
Genera:
 Atyponemertes Friedrich, 1938 
 Atyponemertes Friedrich, 1938 
 Crybelonemertes Sundberg & Gibson, 1995 
 Cryptonemertes Gibson, 1986 
 Emplectonema Stimpson, 1857 
 Halimanemertes Gibson, 1990 
 Ischyronemertes Gibson, 1990 
 Nemertes Johnston, 1837 
 Nemertopsella Wheeler, 1940 
 Nemertopsis Bürger, 1895 
 Poikilonemertes Stiasny-Wijnhoff, 1942 
 Sanjuannemertes Iwata, 2006 
 Satellitenemertes Iwata, 2006 
 Tetranemertes Tshernyshev, 1992 
 Thermanemertes Rogers, Gibson & Tunnicliffe, 1996

References

Monostilifera
Nemertea families